Itilima District is one of the five districts of Simiyu Region of Tanzania, East Africa. Its district capital is  Lagangabilili.
It is bordered to the north by Bariadi District, to the east by Ngorongoro District, to the south by Maswa District and Meatu District, and to the west by Magu District.

As of 2012, the population of Itilima was 313,900. Itilima was established in 2012, when it was split off from Bariadi District and became part of the newly established Simiyu Region.

Transport
The highway that connects Shinyanga Region and Mara Region (trunk road T36) passes through Itilima district from south to north.

Tourism
The east of Itilima District is part of Maswa Game Reserve.

Administrative subdivisions

Wards
As of 2012, Itilima District was administratively divided into 22 wards.

2012 wards
The 22 wards in 2012:

 Budalabujiga
 Bumera
 Chinamili
 Ikindiro
 Kinang'weli
 Lagangabilili
 Lugulu
 Mbita
 Mhunze
 Migato
 Mwalushu
 Mwamapalala
 Mwamtani
 Mwaswale
 Ndolelezi
 Nhobora
 Nkoma
 Nkuyu
 Nyamalapa
 Sagata
 Sawida
 Zagayu

References

Districts of Simiyu Region